La congiuntura, internationally released as  	Hard Time for Princes and One Million Dollars,  is a 1965 Italian comedy film directed by Ettore Scola.

Plot

Cast
Vittorio Gassman ...  Giuliano
Joan Collins ...  Jane
Jacques Bergerac ...  Sandro
Hilda Barry ...  Dana
Pippo Starnazza ...  Francesco
Dino Curcio ...  Salerno
Aldo De Carellis ...  Eduardo
Alfredo Marchetti
Halina Zalewska...  Luisetta (as Alina Zalewska)
Ugo Fangareggi
Maurice Rosemberg
Paolo Bonacelli ...  Zenone
Renato Montalbano ...  Dino
Marino Masé ...  Angelo
Adolfo Eibenstein ...  Enrico

External links
 

1965 films
1960s Italian-language films
1965 comedy films
Films directed by Ettore Scola
Films scored by Luis Bacalov
Italian comedy films
Films with screenplays by Ettore Scola
1960s Italian films